Hasanlu is a Kurdish and Azerbaijani village in Hasanlu Rural District of Mohammadyar District of Naqadeh County, West Azerbaijan province, Iran. At the 2006 National Census, its population was 1,264 in 289 households. The following census in 2011 counted 1,273 people in 364 households. The latest census in 2016 showed a population of 1,277 people in 381 households; it was the largest village in its rural district.

References 

Naqadeh County

Populated places in West Azerbaijan Province

Populated places in Naqadeh County